This is a list of singles that charted in the top ten of the ARIA Charts in 2016. In 2016 forty-six acts reached the top ten for the first time. Justin Bieber had the most top-ten singles in 2016 with five, while The Chainsmokers had four.

Top-ten singles

Key

2015 peaks

2017 peaks

Entries by artist
The following table shows artists who achieved two or more top 10 entries in 2016, including songs that reached their peak in 2015 and 2017. The figures include both main artists and featured artists. The total number of weeks an artist spent in the top ten in 2016 is also shown.

See also
2016 in music
ARIA Charts
List of number-one singles of 2016 (Australia)
List of top 25 singles for 2016 in Australia

References

2016 in Australia
Australia Top 10
Top 10 singles 2016
Australia 2016